"Brotha" is a song by American singer Angie Stone, which appears on her second studio album, Mahogany Soul (2001). It was written by Stone along with Raphael Saadiq, Harold Lilly, Glenn Standridge and Robert C. Ozuna, while production was overseen by Saadiq and Jake and the Phatman. Along with the standard version, a remix version of the song, featuring singer Alicia Keys and rapper Eve, was released as the first single from the album.

Music video
The music video for "Brotha", directed by Chris Robinson features cameos by Will Smith, Calvin Richardson, Luther Vandross, Sinbad, Saadiq, Avant and Larenz Tate, and it honors male leaders such as Malcolm X, Martin Luther King Jr., Marvin Gaye, Muhammad Ali and Colin Powell.

Part II
"Brotha" was officially remixed with vocals from American rapper Eve and singer Alicia Keys. Produced by Stone, Keys and musician Kerry "Krucial" Brothers, J Records liked the remix so much that it was rushed to include the track on Stone’s album. "Brotha (part 2)" contains a sample of Albert King's "I'll Play the Blues for You".

Track listing

Charts

Weekly charts

Year-end charts

References

External links 
 Brotha Part II at Discogs

2001 singles
Alicia Keys songs
Eve (rapper) songs
Songs written by Angie Stone
Songs written by Harold Lilly (songwriter)
Songs written by Raphael Saadiq
2001 songs
Songs written by Robert Ozuna
Hip hop soul songs
Angie Stone songs
Song recordings produced by Raphael Saadiq
Song recordings produced by Alicia Keys